Lleyton Hewitt was the defending champion, but did not participate.

Andy Roddick won in the final 7–5, 6–3, against James Blake.

Seeds
All seeds receive a bye into the second round.

Draw

Finals

Top half

Section 1

Section 2

Bottom half

Section 3

Section 4

References
Main Draw
Qualifying Draw

Legg Mason Tennis Classic Singles